This article contains information about the literary events and publications of 1834.

Events
April – W. Harrison Ainsworth's first novel, the historical romance Rookwood, is published anonymously in London by Richard Bentley, with illustrations by George Cruikshank. Romanticising the highwayman Dick Turpin, it succeeds enough for the author to take up full-time writing. Bentley also publishes Edward Bulwer-Lytton's anonymous popular novel The Last Days of Pompeii in the same year.
June 10 – The Scottish philosopher and writer Thomas Carlyle moves to Cheyne Row (Carlyle's House) in London.
August – Charles Dickens first uses the pen name Boz, in the second installment of "The Boarding-House", one of the Sketches by Boz, originally published in the Monthly Magazine (London).
November 24 – George Sand begins her journal addressed to Alfred de Musset.
unknown date – Carl Jonas Love Almqvist's fourth novel in the "Törnrosens bok" series, The Queen's Tiara (Drottningens juvelsmycke) is published anonymously. Set around the assassination of King Gustav III of Sweden in 1792, it is the first original historical novel written in Sweden, and features a bisexual character, Tintomara.

New books

Fiction
W. Harrison Ainsworth – Rookwood
Carl Jonas Love Almqvist – The Queen's Tiara
Honoré de Balzac
The Quest of the Absolute
La Fille aux yeux d'or (The Girl with Eyes of Gold)
Le Père Goriot
Edward Bulwer – The Last Days of Pompeii
Selina Davenport – Personation
Benjamin Disraeli – The Infernal Marriage
Catherine Gore – The Hamiltons
 Tommaso Grossi – Marco Visconti
Barbara Hofland – The Captives in India
Harriet Martineau – Illustrations of Political Economy (nine volumes, in fictional form)
Frederick Maurice – Eustace Conway
Aleksandr Pushkin – The Queen of Spades ( – Pikovaya dama)
Agnes C. Hall (as Rosalia St. Clair) – The Pauper Boy

Children and young people
Frederick Marryat
Jacob Faithful
Peter Simple

Drama
John Baldwin Buckstone – Isabelle; or, A Woman's Life
Alfred de Musset – Lorenzaccio
Aleksander Fredro – Zemsta (Revenge)
Franz Grillparzer – Der Traum, ein Leben (The Dream, a Life)
Mary Russell Mitford – Charles the First
Juliusz Słowacki
Balladyna
Kordian
Henry Taylor – Philip van Artevelde

Poetry
Samuel Taylor Coleridge – Poetical Works (last edition read in proof by author)
Adam Mickiewicz – Pan Tadeusz

Non-fiction
George Bancroft – History of the United States, volume 1
Davy Crockett – A Narrative of the Life of David Crockett, written by himself
Henry Hallam, ed. – Remains in Verse and Prose of Arthur Henry Hallam
Heinrich Heine – Zur Geschichte der Religion und Philosophie in Deutschland (The History of Religion and Philosophy in Germany)
Søren Kierkegaard writing as 'A' – "Another Defense Of Woman's Great Abilities" ("Ogsaa et Forsvar for Qvindens hoie Anlæg"
Richard Monckton Milnes – Memorials of a Tour in some Parts of Greece, Chiefly Poetical
Lancelot Edward Threlkeld – An Australian Grammar

Births
January 1 – Ludovic Halévy, French playwright and author (died 1908)
January 22 – Jennie Fowler Willing, American author, educator and reformer (died 1916)
January 28 – Julia Carter Aldrich, American author and editor (died 1924)
February 9 – Felix Dahn, German writer (died 1912)
March – Thomas Purnell, Welsh-born English drama critic and essayist (died 1889)
March 6 – George du Maurier, English cartoonist and novelist (died 1896)
March 24 – Mary Lynde Craig, American writer and attorney (died 1921)
March 24 – William Morris, English poet and designer (died 1896)
April 5 – Frank R. Stockton, American short story writer (died 1902)
April 7 – Emma Southwick Brinton, American army nurse and foreign correspondent (died 1922)
April 21 – Henry Spencer Ashbee, English bibliophile (died 1900)
April 26 – Charles Farrar Browne (Artemus Ward), American humorist (died 1867)
May 28 – Lavilla Esther Allen, American author, poet and reader (died 1903)
July 9 – Jan Neruda, Czech writer (died 1891)
August 31 – Esther Pugh, American reformer, editor and publisher (died 1908)
September 9 – Joseph Henry Shorthouse, English novelist (died 1903)
September 15 – Heinrich von Treitschke, German historian (died 1896)
October 1 – Mary Mackellar, née Cameron, Scottish Gaelic poet and translator (died 1890)
November 10 – José Hernández, Argentine poet (died 1886)
November 23 – James Thomson ("Bysshe Vanolis"), Scottish poet (died 1882)
unknown date – Percy Hetherington Fitzgerald, Irish-born literary biographer, drama critic and sculptor (died 1925)

Deaths
February 12 – Friedrich Schleiermacher, German theologian and philosopher (born 1768)
February 17 – John Thelwall, British orator, writer, political reformer, journalist, poet, elocutionist and speech therapist (born 1764)
May 13 – John Jones, Welsh Anglican priest and writer (born 1775)
July 25 – Samuel Taylor Coleridge, English Romantic poet and critic (born 1772)
September 16 – William Blackwood, Scottish publisher (born 1776)
December 5 – Thomas Pringle, Scottish writer, poet and abolitionist (born 1789)
December 23 – Thomas Malthus, English political economist (born 1766)
December 27 – Charles Lamb, English essayist (erysipelas; born 1775)

References

 
Years of the 19th century in literature